Papilio thersites, the Thersites swallowtail or false Androgeus swallowtail, is a Neotropical butterfly of the family Papilionidae. It is endemic to Jamaica. P. thersites F. (9 a) is similar to the well known P. lycophron Hbn. In the male the yellow band on the forewing is very broad and the cell-spot very large. In the female the forewing has a curved yellow band. — Jamaica. The larvae are like that of P. lycophron.

References

Lewis, H. L., 1974 Butterflies of the World  Page 25, figure 11

External links

thersites
Butterflies of Jamaica
Endemic fauna of Jamaica
Butterflies described in 1775